The Buffalo Party of Saskatchewan is a libertarian  provincial political party in Saskatchewan. The party was established in 2020 and contested its first election that same year.

History

The day after the 2019 federal election, Scott Moe, premier of Saskatchewan, proposed a "New Deal" with the federal government. He called for an end to the federal carbon tax, renegotiation of the equalization formula, and action on oil-pipeline projects. In the weeks after the election, volunteers began collecting signatures to form a new party to promote the independence of Western Canada ("Wexit"). They called on Moe to hold a referendum on separation, saying that if he did not agree they would form a party to do so.

On March 10, 2020, Wexit Saskatchewan was registered as a provincial party by Elections Saskatchewan. Its first interim leader was Jake Wall. Once registered, Wexit Saskatchewan proposed a referendum on independence in its platform.

On June 3, 2020, the party's executive board voted to change the party's name to Buffalo Party of Saskatchewan. That decision was ratified by a membership vote. In July 2020, the party officially changed its name and named Wade Sira as its new interim leader. The party ran seventeen candidates, including Sira, in the 2020 provincial election. They did not win any seats and finished in second in four ridings.

On August 31, 2021, interim leader Wade Sira was removed as leader of the party.

2022 leadership election 
On March 25, 2022, Phillip Zajac, the party's candidate in the Estevan riding in the 2020 provincial election, became the first elected leader of the Buffalo Party of Saskatchewan, defeating Clint Arnason, the party's candidate in the 2022 by-election in the Athabasca riding. 

The party contested the September 2022 provincial by-election in Saskatoon Meewasin, with candidate Mark Friesen, who had been the People's Party of Canada candidate in Saskatoon—Grasswood in the 2021 federal election.

Electoral performance 
The Buffalo Party, despite having been registered only months before, finished second in four rural ridings, and finished third place in the overall popular vote in the 2020 provincial election with 2.56%, despite running far fewer candidates than the Green Party or the Progressive Conservatives. The party had second place finishes against the Saskatchewan Party in Cypress Hills, Kindersley, Estevan, and Cannington.

|-
!rowspan="2" colspan="2"|Party
!rowspan="2"|Leader
!rowspan="2"|Candidates
!colspan="4"|Seats
!colspan="3"|Popular vote
|-
!2016
!Dissol.
!2020
!+/-
!Votes
!%
!% change

|align=left|Scott Moe
|61 ||51 ||46 || 48 || -3 || 269,996 || 61.12 || –1.41

|align=left|Ryan Meili
|61 ||10|||13|| 13 || +3 || 140,584 || 31.82 || +1.54

|align=left|Wade Sira (i)
| 17 || 0 || 0 || 0 || ±0 || 11,298 || 2.56 || New

|align=left|Naomi Hunter
| 60 ||0 ||0 || 0 || ±0 || 10,033 || 2.27 || +0.43

|align=left|Ken Grey
| 31 || 0 || 0 || 0 || ±0 || 8,404 || 1.90 || +0.62

|align=left|Robert Rudachyk (i)
| 3 || 0 || 0 || 0 || ±0 || 355 || 0.08 || –3.51

| colspan="2" style="text-align:left;"|Independent
| 3 || 0 || 0 || 0 || ±0 || 1,076 || 0.24 || –0.15

| colspan="4" style="text-align:left;"|Vacant
| 2 || colspan="5" 
|-
|align=left colspan="8"|Blank and invalid votes || 3,265 || 0.73
|-
| style="text-align:left;" colspan="3"|Total
|236 ||61 ||61 || 61 || 0 || 445,011 ||100.00 || 0
|-
|align=left colspan="8"|Eligible voters / turnout || 841,807 || 52.86
|}

Party leaders 

Kris Carley is the party president.

See also 
 Western alienation

References

External links 
 

Conservative parties in Canada
Right-wing populism in Canada
Provincial political parties in Saskatchewan
Political parties established in 2020
Secessionist organizations in Canada
Pro-independence parties